Pāvilosta Port is the port authority of Pāvilosta, Latvia. The port is located near the Saka River.

References

External links 
 Port of Pāvilosta
 Pāvilosta marina

Ports and harbours of Latvia
Port authorities